, abbreviated as  and subtitled Beautiful Word Beautiful World, is an Anime youth drama film produced by A-1 Pictures released in 2015. The film was directed by Tatsuyuki Nagai and written by Mari Okada. Masayoshi Tanaka served as the chief animation director and designed the characters. The trio, under the creative team name of Super Peace Busters, had previously worked on the anime series Anohana: The Flower We Saw That Day and its film adaptation, as well as Toradora!. The film was released in theaters in Japan on September 19, 2015.

Plot
As a young girl, Jun Naruse was very excitable and talkative. She used to love fairy tales and was always excited about the castle on the hilltop, which in reality was a love hotel. 

One day, she saw her father leaving the love hotel. Not realising the significance of it, she exposes her father's infidelity. Her father blames her for the family conflict that follows. While she is crying, she imagines a fairy egg that curses her by sealing her words, so she won't hurt people again.

As a result of her "curse", Jun is not able to speak and suffers stomachaches whenever she tries to speak.

Years later, when Jun is attending high school, her homeroom teacher, Kazuki Jōshima, signs her up as a member of the Community Outreach Event along with three other classmates:

 Takumi Sakagami, a shy member of the computer music researching club
 Natsuki Nitō, a cheerleader and honor student
 Daiki Tasaki, the former ace of the baseball team, who has a broken elbow

When she goes to the committee's room to reject her position, Jun hears Takumi singing and is captivated. She then tells Takumi about her past using her phone, and requests for him to turn her words into a song. In this way, Jun learns that though she cannot speak, the 'curse' doesn’t affect her if she sings. Her class decides to perform a musical for their school festival based on the story of her experience narrated in the form of a fairy tale.

While discussing the musical, Daiki has a falling out with his teammates. Jun intervenes, which leads to another stomachache, but this improves her bonds with the other Committee members. Misunderstanding Takumi's concern for Jun as a sign that he is falling in love with her, Natsuki tells Takumi that she will cheer them on, despite Natsuki's feelings for Takumi.

The next day, Daiki makes amends with his teammates. As they spend time together preparing for the musical, Jun starts to develop feelings for Takumi, while Daiki starts to develop feelings for Jun. Daiki asks Takumi about his relationship with Natsuki, having heard rumors that both of them were dating during middle school, but Takumi denies this since Natsuki had told her classmates that they were not dating when she was asked. Natsuki also tells Daiki that she currently has a boyfriend. On the night before the musical, Takumi asks Natsuki about the boy she's dating currently, leading Natsuki to finally reveal that the boy she's referring to is none other than Takumi himself before she accuses him of falling in love with Jun. Takumi reveals that while he is concerned about Jun, he is not in love with her and he has always regretted not trying to convey his feelings for Natsuki during middle school even when he was aware of her feelings for him at that time. Unbeknownst to them, Jun overhears their conversation. Heartbroken, she runs away and meets the fairy egg, who reveals that she has worsened the curse by trying to convey her feelings for Takumi. Jun doesn't show up on the day of the musical, leaving Natsuki to fill her role while Takumi frantically goes searching for her.

Takumi finds Jun at the love hotel that has been shut down. To his surprise, she can talk normally. Jun angrily lashes out at Takumi as he tells her that the reason she is unable to convey her words is not because of the fairy egg's curse but because of Jun's fear. Wanting to hear her voice once more, Takumi allows Jun to lash out all of her anger and frustration until she is satisfied. Jun confesses her feelings for Takumi, but it is revealed that Takumi is still in love with Natsuki, to which Jun replies that she knew. Takumi then expresses his gratitude for Jun because before he met her, he was unable to say what he truly felt and only went along with everyone else. This convinces Jun to perform in the musical. Jun and Takumi arrive just in time before the final scene, allowing Jun to sing and convey her feelings to her mother who finally understands what she has been through. As the musical ends, Jun realizes that the fairy egg was actually nothing but imagination that she created to have someone she could blame for her condition, and now she decides to open up her heart, coming to terms with her past.

As the movie ends, Takumi and Natsuki reconcile their relationship, while Daiki finally confesses his feelings to Jun.

Cast
 Inori Minase as 
 Kōki Uchiyama as 
 Sora Amamiya as 
 Yoshimasa Hosoya as 
 Keiji Fujiwara as 
 Kouki Uchiyama as Fairy Egg

Characters

Jun is the protagonist. She was originally a very upbeat, cheerful child, but after she exposed her father's unfaithfulness to her mother, she became quiet, timid and unable to speak. She later finds her voice by joining Takumi and the others in making a musical, in which she plays the main character.

Takumi is another central character, who like Jun, is also quiet and timid. Like Jun, his parents are divorced, and he lives in the care of his grandparents. He plays piano, and played a major role in helping Jun set up the musical for the Charity Committee.

As a member of the school's baseball team, he is initially seen as grumpy and fully rejects the idea of the musical. Through the course of the movie, he learns to warm up to his classmates, and plays a central role in the musical. He also starts to develop feelings for Jun, and eventually confesses his feeling to her.

Takumi's ex-girlfriend, still has feelings for Takumi. Though initially reluctant to join the musical, she warms up, and becomes a close friend of Jun. It is suggested Daiki had feelings for her, though she rejected them.
Fairy Egg
A small mystical being resembling a white egg that only Jun can see. He has a thin mustache, two black dots for eyes, while wearing a tuxedo and a fedora hat with a feather on top. After Jun accepted his request to help her as a child, the Fairy Egg put a curse on her and sealed her mouth closed so that she'll never speak and hurt people ever again. In the end, he is revealed to be a fragment of Jun's imagination. He has a black spot floating around his left hand and when he hides it, he turns into a prince which is a pun with the kanjis of "玉子(tamago=egg)" and "王子(ouji=prince)."

Music

Theme song

Lyrics: Yasushi Akimoto
Arrangement: Akira Sunset, APAZZI
Vocals: Nogizaka46

Insert song
"Harmonia"
Lyrics: Kotringo
Composition & Arrangement: Mito (from Clammbon)
Vocals: Kotringo

Others
These are already-existing songs with a bit of modification that are used in the drama scene.
"Sky Symphony" from 'Around the world in 80 days'.

"Over the Rainbow"
Lyrics: E.Y. Harburg
Composition: Harold Arlen
Arrangement: Mito (from Clammbon)
Vocals: Natsumi Kiyoura

"Piano Sonata No. 8 in C minor, Op. 13, 2nd Movement"

"Swanee"
Lyrics: Irving Caesar
Composition: George Gershwin

"Summertime"
Lyrics: DuBose Heyward
Composition: George Gershwin

Those Were The Days (Mary Hopkin song)
Lyrics: Gene Raskin
Composition: Boris Formin

Lyrics: Kōhan Kawauchi
Composition: Yōichi Suzuki
Vocals: Sasara Satō, Mina Aoe is referred to in the film

Lyrics: Daisuke Kaga
Composition: Yūji Koseki

Composition: Yuki Ozaki (from Galileo Galilei)

"Greensleeves"

Release
The film was released in theaters in Japan on September 19, 2015. Aniplex of America released the film in North America on November 11 of the same year.

Reception

Box office
By November 1, 2015, the film had earned 1,015,293,050 (about ) in the Japanese box office. The film grossed  worldwide.

Critical response
Nick Creamer of Anime News Network (ANN) rated the film a B+ rating. In his review, he said that despite the last act being hampered by typical dramatic tropes, he praised the film for its well-written characters, grounded storytelling and classically minded soundtrack, concluding with, "It's an endearing little film that tells one small story with some real grace. Definitely recommended." Fellow ANN editor Zac Bertschy placed the film at number four on his top 5 best anime list of 2015, calling it "a sweet, lighthearted and sincere little drama" with solid character animation and emotional moments, and commended it for using the medium's limitless potential to tell its story regardless of genre, concluding with, "I imagine any other country on earth creating an animated film like Anthem of the Heart. Every now and then you've got to stop and recognize the truly unique things about anime that are still true – like the fact that it tells stories with animation that no one else does."

Accolades

Live-action film
A live-action film adaptation was announced in March 2017. Directed by Naoto Kumzawa, it stars Kyoko Yoshine, Kento Nakajima, Anna Ishii and Ichiro Kan. Filming began in March 2017 in Chichibu, Saitama and the film was released on July 22, 2017.

Notes

References

External links
  
 
 
 

2015 films
2015 anime films
2015 drama films
2010s high school films
2010s Japanese-language films
Aniplex
A-1 Pictures
Animated drama films
Drama anime and manga
Films about curses
Films about musical theatre
Films set in Saitama Prefecture
Films with screenplays by Mari Okada
Japanese drama films
Japanese high school films
Noitamina